Sudarat Butrprom or stage name Tukky is a Thai actress and comedian, known as the "queen of comedy" for her TV comedy appearances.

Biography
She was born on March 15, 1979, in Udon Thani, Isan (northeastern region) of Thailand. She started working at Workpoint Entertainment as a costume attendant. She has been a comedian since 2005 as a sidekick with Sam Cha Gang (Thai : แก็งสามช่า) with Mum Jokmok, Pongsak Pongsuwan (Teng) and Chusak Iamsuk (Nong). Her involvement with Sam Cha Gang ceased in 2017 while working in the show called Ching Roi Ching Lan. She has acted many films and televisions in her acting career.

Sudarat is best known for her breakthrough role as "Teacher Inn" in the Thai romantic comedy film "First Love", starring with Mario Maurer and Pimchanok Luevisadpaibul. The film releases on August 12, 2010, and become 2011 Asian sleeper hit film. Moreover, she is known as "Teacher Phensri" in Talok Hok Chak.

She has 13 year over relationship with Kamthon Phonamkham, and married on 25 December 2016.

Filmography

Movies
 Yam Yasothon (แหยม ยโสธร) (2005)
 Yam Yasothon 2 (แหยม ยโสธร 2) (2007)
 Hoa Taew Taek Haek Kra Jueng (หอแต๋วแตกแหกกระเจิง) (2009)
 Tukky, Jao Ying Khaai Khob (ตุ๊กกี้ เจ้าหญิงขายกบ) (2010)
 First Love (สิ่งเล็กเล็ก ที่เรียกว่า...รัก) (2010)
 Panya&Renu 2 (ปัญญา เรณู 2) (2012)
 Luang Phee Jazz 4G (หลวงพี่แจ๊ส 4G) (2016)

Television programs
Gang of Gags (ตลก 6 ฉาก) (2005–present)
 Ching Roi Ching Lan (ชิงร้อยชิงล้าน) (2005-2017)
 Mai Thong Kham:Mor Lam Fang Phet (ไมค์ทองคำ หมอลำฝังเพชร) (2016–present)

Judge
 The Mask Line Thai (2018)

Awards
 2010 - Luk Ka Tan Yoo (ลูกกตัญญู) from Given for Social Organization by praton-age of queen
 2012 - Old Students great (ศิษย์เก่าดีเด่น) from Maha Sarakham University
 2016 - Pra Kinnari (พระกินรี)'''

References

External links 

1979 births
Living people
Sudarat Butrprom
Sudarat Butrprom
Sudarat Butrprom
Sudarat Butrprom
Sudarat Butrprom
Sudarat Butrprom
Sudarat Butrprom